The following is a list of telenovelas and series produced by Televisa in the 2020s.

Years

References 

Televisa 2020s
Mexican television-related lists
2020s